Anthocharis is a Holarctic genus of the butterfly tribe Anthocharini, in the family Pieridae. These are typically small, white-hued butterflies that have colorful marks just inside the tips of the forewings. The tip colors are usually a red-orange hue, hence the name "orange tip". The larvae of these butterfly often consume cruciferous plants containing chemicals called glucosinolates. This genus is characterized by two of the five subcostal veins branching off before the apex of the cell, by the upper radial being only little united with the subcostal, and by the central discocellular being rather long. In all the species the males have at least the apical portion of the forewing orange red or yellow. Only one species inhabits also the northern districts of the Palearctic region, all the others are found in the south of the Palearctic region, also some species occur in North America, but not one species extends into the tropics. The Anthocharis species have only one brood. The butterflies occur in spring.

Species

Species and subspecies belonging to the genus Anthocharis include:
 Anthocharis bambusarum (Oberthür)
 Anthocharis belia (Linnaeus, 1767) – Morocco orange tip
 Anthocharis bieti (Oberthür, 1884)
 Anthocharis cardamines (Linnaeus, 1758) – orange tip
 Anthocharis cardamines phoenissa (Kalchberg, 1894)
 Anthocharis carolinae Back, 2006 (Mazandaran (Iran), South Armenia)
 Anthocharis cethura (C. & R. Felder, 1865) – desert orangetip
 Anthocharis cethura cethura – desert orangetip
 Anthocharis cethura bajacalifornica J.F. Emmel, T.C. Emmel & Mattoon, 1998
 Anthocharis cethura catalina (Meadows, 1937) – Catalina orangetip
 Anthocharis cethura pima W.H. Edwards, 1888
 Anthocharis damone (Boisduval, 1836) – eastern orange tip
 Anthocharis euphenoides (Staudinger, 1869) – Provence orange tip
 Anthocharis gruneri (Herrich-Schäffer, 1851) – Grüner's orange tip
 Anthocharis julia (Edwards, 1872) – southern Rocky Mountain orangetip
 Anthocharis lanceolata (Lucas, 1852) – gray marble
 Anthocharis lanceolata australis (Grinnell, 1908)
 Anthocharis lanceolata desertolimbus J.F. Emmel, T.C. Emmel & Mattoon, 1998
 Anthocharis limonea (Butler, 1871) – Mexican orangetip
 Anthocharis midea (Hübner, 1809) – falcate orangetip
 Anthocharis midea texas Gatrelle, 1998
 Anthocharis monastiriensis Soures, 1998 (Tunisia)
 Anthocharis sara (Lucas, 1852) – Sara's orangetip
 Anthocharis sara inghami Gunder, 1932
 Anthocharis sara thoosa (Scudder, 1878) – southwestern orangetip
 Anthocharis scolymus (Butler, 1866) – yellow tip
 Anthocharis stella (Edwards, 1879) – Stella orangetip
 Anthocharis stella stella – Stella orangetip
 Anthocharis stella browningi – Utah Stella orangetip
 Anthocharis taipaichana (Verity, 1911)
 Anthocharis thibetana (Oberthür, 1886) (West China) has the orange patch as in A. cardamines turritis, but the veins of the hindwing above are bordered with sulfur-yellow.

References

External links

Images representing Anthocharis at Consortium for the Barcode of Life
Euroleps Via search

 
Anthocharini
Pieridae genera
Taxa named by Jean Baptiste Boisduval
Taxa named by André Marie Constant Duméril
Taxa named by Jules Pierre Rambur